Pentarthrum is a genus of beetle in family Curculionidae. It contains about 70 species of mainly tropical distribution.

Partial list of species 
 Pentarthrum angustissimum Wollaston, 1873
 Pentarthrum blackburni Sharp, 1878
 Pentarthrum halodorum Perkins, 1926 	
 Pentarthrum huttoni Wollaston, 1854 	
 Pentarthrum obscurum Sharp, 1878

References 

Cossoninae
Taxonomy articles created by Polbot